Beegum is an unincorporated community in Shasta and Tehama counties, in the U.S. state of California.

History
A post office was in operation at Beegum from 1895 until it was discontinued in 1917. The community took its name from nearby Beegum Creek, cf. Beegum Peak.

References

Unincorporated communities in Shasta County, California
Unincorporated communities in Tehama County, California